Dnieper is a major river, rising in Russia and flowing through Belarus and Ukraine to the Black Sea.

Dnieper may also refer to:

 Dnieper Ukraine, usually referring territory on either side of the middle course of the Dnieper River
 Battle of the Dnieper, a World War II military campaign

See also

 Dnepr (disambiguation)
 Dnipro (disambiguation)
 On the Dnieper, a 1932 ballet by Prokofiev